The 4th Alberta Legislative Assembly was in session from February 7, 1918, to June 23, 1921, with the membership of the assembly determined by the results of the 1917 Alberta general election held on June 7, 1917. The Legislature officially resumed on February 7, 1918, and continued until the fourth session was prorogued on April 19, 1921 and dissolved on June 23, 1921, prior to the 1921 Alberta general election.

Alberta's second government was controlled by the majority Liberal Party led by Premier Arthur Sifton, who would resign shortly after the 1917 election on October 30, 1917 to contest the 1917 Canadian general election for the Unionist Party under Prime Minister Robert Borden in support of the Borden government during the Conscription Crisis of 1917. Charles Stewart would be Sifton's choice as replacement as Premier, which was accepted by Lieutenant Governor Robert Brett. The Official Opposition was the Conservative Party led by George Hoadley for the first session, and James Ramsey for the remaining sessions. The Speaker was Charles W. Fisher who continued in the role from the 1st, 2nd and 3rd assembly, and would serve in the role until his death from the 1918 flu pandemic on May 5, 1919. Fisher was replaced as Speaker of the Legislative Assembly by Charles Pingle.

The 4th Assembly would be the final time the Alberta Liberal Party would hold government, being replaced by the United Farmers of Alberta following the 1921 general election.

Members of the 4th Legislative Assembly

Sifton Cabinet

Stewart Cabinet

Government

Official Opposition

Opposition

Members of the Alberta Non-Partisan League, became members of the United Farmers of Alberta on July 15, 1919.

Standings changes in the 4th general election

References

Further reading

External links
Alberta Legislative Assembly
Legislative Assembly of Alberta Members Book
By-elections 1905 to present

04